The 1955 Colorado Buffaloes football team was an American football team that represented the University of Colorado as a member of the Big Seven Conference during the 1955 college football season. Led by eighth-year head coach Dallas Ward, the Buffaloes compiled an overall record of 6–4 with a mark of 3–3 in conference play, tying for third place in the Big 7.

Schedule

References

Colorado
Colorado Buffaloes football seasons
Colorado Buffaloes football